St Cuthbert's Catholic High School is a Roman Catholic mixed secondary school situated in St Helens, Merseyside, England.

History 
Built-in 1957, St Cuthbert's is one of the oldest Secondary Schools in St Helens, famous in the 1960s for its rugby and football achievements. The first Head Teacher was Frederick Grundy.

In 2004, St Cuthbert's became a Business and Enterprise College thanks to funding from Scottish Power Learning. In 2006, St Cuthbert's renamed itself as a College. As part of its specialism, it opened a built-in hotel and café. Lindisfarne House was a hotel built on the school by Farne Limited. It was a National and International Exchange Accommodation Centre offering accommodation for national and international school exchanges, visiting students, amateur sports organisations and other national and international visitors and groups. It had 13 en-suite single or twin rooms on the first floor. In 2004, the Hotel was re-opened by the Earl and Countess of Wessex. The building occupied by the hotel was previously used as a classroom by the school. The hotel closed in 2014.

In 2015 the school was renamed St Cuthbert’s Catholic High School. The building previously occupied by the hotel has been redeveloped to provide seven extra classrooms.

References

External links 
 

Secondary schools in St Helens, Merseyside
Catholic secondary schools in the Archdiocese of Liverpool
Educational institutions established in 1958
1958 establishments in England
Voluntary aided schools in England